Omar Dominguez Palafox (born 13 April 1988 in San Andrés Tuxtla, Veracruz, Mexico) is a Mexican professional footballer who plays as a centre-back for Liga Nacional club Guastatoya.

Honours
Guastatoya
Liga Nacional de Guatemala: Clausura 2018, Apertura 2018, Apertura 2020

References

External links
Page on ASCENSO MX

1988 births
Living people
Footballers from Veracruz
Mexican footballers
Club Celaya footballers
Liga MX players
Association football defenders